Dragon boat racing at the 2008 Asian Beach Games was held in Bali, Indonesia from 19 to 21 October 2008.

Medalists

Men

Women

Medal table

Results

Men

250 m
21 October

Heats

Repechage

Finals

500 m
20 October

Heats

Repechage

Finals

1000 m
19 October

Heats

Repechage

Finals

Women

250 m
21 October

500 m
20 October

1000 m
19 October

References
 Official site

2008 Asian Beach Games events
Asian Beach Games
2008